The British Academy Television Craft Award for Best Production Design is one of the categories presented by the British Academy of Film and Television Arts (BAFTA) within the British Academy Television Craft Awards, the craft awards were established in 2000 with their own, separate ceremony as a way to spotlight technical achievements, without being overshadowed by the main production categories. According to the BAFTA website, for a programme to be eligible to this category it "should contain a significant amount of original design."

The category was gone through some name changes:
 From 1955 to 1965, an individual award named Best Designer was presented.
 From 1966 to 2000 it was presented as Best Design.
 Since 2001 it has been presented as Best Production Design.

Winners and nominees

1950s
Best Designer

1960s
Best Designer

Best Design

1970s

1980s

1990s

2000s
Best Design

Best Production Design

2010s

2020s

See also
 Primetime Emmy Award for Outstanding Production Design for a Narrative Contemporary Program (One Hour or More)
 Primetime Emmy Award for Outstanding Production Design for a Narrative Program (Half-Hour or Less)
 Primetime Emmy Award for Outstanding Production Design for a Narrative Period or Fantasy Program (One Hour or More)

References

External links
 

Production Design